Yu Yong (born 1961) is a Chinese billionaire businessman. He is the founder and head of the Cathay Fortune Corp., also known as Hongshang Industrial Holdings Group which is an investor in the mining company China Molybdenum. Cathay Fortune's operations are based out of Shanghai. On the Forbes 2016 list of the world's billionaires, he was ranked #688 with a net worth of US$2.5 billion.

In 2012, Cathay made a $830 AUD hostile bid to takeover the Australia-based Discovery Metals. The bid was made with loans from the China-Africa Development Fund. Cathay walked away from the deal, due to concerns about the Boseto copper project in Botswana.

In addition to his mining interests, Yu Yong has also been involved in other business ventures. He is a major shareholder in Contemporary Amperex Technology (CATL), a Chinese battery maker that went public in 2018. Prior to its initial public offering (IPO), Yu Yong acquired a 1.69% stake in Contemporary Amperex Technology via a pre-IPO sale before it went public in 2018.

Yu has also been involved in real estate development, and is a major investor in the Shanghai real estate market. His company, Cathay Fortune, is also involved in the financial sector and has investments in several banks and financial institutions in China.

Despite his success, Yu Yong has faced some controversies in his business dealings. His hostile bid for the Australian mining company, Discovery Metals, was met with resistance from the Australian government and shareholders. Additionally, his involvement in the Boseto copper project in Botswana was criticized for its potential negative impact on the local environment and communities.

References

1960s births
Living people
Businesspeople from Shanghai
Billionaires from Shanghai
Chinese company founders
Chinese mining businesspeople